Triplemanía XXX was a three-day professional wrestling pay-per-view (PPV) event promoted and produced by the Mexican professional wrestling promotion Lucha Libre AAA Worldwide (AAA or Triple A). The event was held on April 30, June 18, and October 15, 2022. The April 30 event took place at Estadio de Béisbol Monterrey in Monterrey, the June 18 event took place at Estadio Caliente Xoloitzcuintles in Tijuana and the October 15 event took place at Arena Ciudad de México in Mexico City. It marked the 30th year in a row that AAA has held a Triplemanía show and comprised the 37th, 38th, and 39th overall shows held under the Triplemanía banner since 1993. The annual Triplemanía show is AAA's biggest event of the year, serving as the culmination of major storylines in what has been described as AAA's version of WrestleMania or their Super Bowl event. Held as part of AAA's 30th Anniversary Tour, Triplemanía XXX was the first Triplemanía event since 1996 to be held across three days. The event aired on PPV via the FITE TV service.

The event was themed around the Ruleta de la Muerte tournament, in which eight luchadores enmascarados wrestled in a series of matches where the losers advanced to a Lucha de Apuestas Mask vs. Mask match on the third day of the event. In the finals, Pentagón Jr. defeated Villano IV to successfully defend his mask and win the mask of Villano.

Production

Background
2022 marked the 30th year that the Mexican professional wrestling company Lucha Libre AAA Worldwide (Triple A or AAA) has held their annual flagship Triplemanía show. Triplemanía XXX comprised three shows – the 37th, 38th, and 39th overall Triplemanía shows promoted by AAA (AAA promoted more than one Triplemanía event from 1994 to 1997 and from 2019 onward). Since the 2012 event, Triplemanía has taken place at the Arena Ciudad de México (Mexico City Arena), an indoor arena in Azcapotzalco, Mexico City, Mexico that has a maximum capacity of 22,300 spectators. On January 25, 2022, AAA announced that Triplemanía XXX would be held across three days in three cities. In addition to Arena Ciudad de México, Triplemanía XXX was held in Estadio de Béisbol Monterrey and Estadio Caliente Xoloitzcuintles. Triplemanía XXX was the second Triplemanía event held outside of Arena Ciudad de México during the 2020s and the third outside Mexico City since 2007.

Triplemanía is the company's biggest show of the year, the AAA equivalent of WWE's WrestleMania or New Japan Pro-Wrestling's Wrestle Kingdom event.

Storylines
Triplemanía XXX featured 25 professional wrestling matches across the three nights, with different wrestlers involved in pre-existing scripted feuds, plots and storylines. Wrestlers portrayed either heels (referred to as rudos in Mexico, those that portray the "bad guys") or faces (técnicos in Mexico, the "good guy" characters) as they engaged in a series of tension-building events, which culminated in a wrestling match.

During a press conference on January 25, 2022, AAA announced that Triplemanía XXX would be themed around the Ruleta de la Muerte tournament in which eight luchadores enmascarados will wrestle in a series of matches where the losers will advance to a Lucha de Apuestas Mask vs. Mask match on the third day of the event. The participants of the tournament where revealed to be Último Dragón, Blue Demon Jr., Psycho Clown, Pentagón Jr., L. A. Park, Villano IV, Canek, and Rayo de Jalisco Jr.

During a press conference on March 19, 2022, AAA announced that a Steel Cage match featuring multiple luchadoras enmascaradas would occur at the Triplemanía XXX: Tijuana event. The last two luchadoras who do not escape from the cage will compete in a Lucha de Apuestas Mask vs. Mask match. The participants in the match were revealed as Lady Shani, La Hiedra, Flammer, Maravilla, Chik Tormenta, Reina Dorada, and Sexy Star II.

Results

Triplemanía XXX: Monterrey (April 30)

Triplemanía XXX: Tijuana (June 18)

Triplemanía XXX: Mexico City (October 15)

Ruleta de la Muerte bracket
</onlyinclude>
As the tournament ends with loser of the final being unmasked, at each round of the Ruleta de la Muerte tournament, the losers, not the winners, "advance" to the next round. In the finals, Pentagón Jr. defeated Villano IV; because of his defeat, Villano IV had to unmask.

See also
2022 in professional wrestling

Notes

References

2022 in professional wrestling
Triplemanía
April 2022 events in Mexico
June 2022 events in Mexico
October 2022 events in Mexico
2022 in Mexico